HDRI may stand for:

 High dynamic range imaging
 Hot direct reduced iron, a form of iron